Mont Saint-Sauveur International, often abbreviated to MSSI, is a company which owns several ski resorts in Canada, most notably in Quebec's Laurentian Mountains. The company also runs several housing developments.

Ski resorts

References

External links
 

Companies based in Quebec